Coleshill Parkway is a railway station at Hams Hall on the Birmingham to Peterborough railway line, serving Coleshill in Warwickshire, England. Sitting on the site of the former Coleshill station which closed in 1968, the current station was opened in 2007, it is owned by Network Rail and managed by West Midlands Trains train operating company (TOC); all rail services are operated by CrossCountry.

History

First station (1842–1968)
The first station at the site was opened in 1842, by the Birmingham and Derby Junction Railway on its line from Whitacre Junction to Lawley Street, and was originally known as Forge Mills. A second station nearby had previously been called 'Coleshill' but this was on the Stonebridge Railway; a different line nearby. In 1923 this second station (which had lost its passenger service in 1917) was renamed , and Forge Mills station was renamed Coleshill.

However this second Coleshill station, the former Forge Mills, was closed in March 1968.

Current station
After the closure of the station. Coleshill was left with no railway connection and as a result. The nearest stations to the town were in Water Orton, Atherstone and Marston Green. In 2006, work started on a new station called Coleshill Parkway which was built and opened on the site of the former Coleshill (Forge Mills) station. The new station was originally scheduled to open in Spring 2007, but construction delays postponed the opening to 18 September 2007. The new station cost £9 million to build. It was jointly funded by the Department for Transport, Warwickshire County Council and the John Laing Group, with developer contributions secured by North Warwickshire Borough Council. The opening ceremony was attended by the son of the last stationmaster of the old station.

Facilities
Facilities on site include a 200-space car park and a ticket office. Many signs are in place for local access to the station.

The station incorporates a bus interchange providing direct bus connections to Birmingham city centre on the X13 operated by National Express West Midlands and Birmingham Airport on the 75 operated by Claribel Coaches, taking around fifteen minutes to the airport.

Tickets for the bus to the airport can be bought from any rail retailer. Tickets to Birmingham International can be routed via New Street or the bus; although the same price these are not interchangeable. The bus connection is often quicker if travelling from the east (Leicester).

Services

References

External links

 Rail Around Birmingham and the West Midlands: Coleshill Parkway railway station
Coleshill {Forge Mills} entry on Warwickshirerailways.com

Railway stations in Warwickshire
DfT Category E stations
Former Midland Railway stations
Railway stations in Great Britain opened in 1842
Railway stations in Great Britain closed in 1968
Railway stations opened by Network Rail
Railway stations in Great Britain opened in 2007
Railway stations served by CrossCountry
Coleshill, Warwickshire
Reopened railway stations in Great Britain
1842 establishments in England
Railway stations in Great Britain not served by their managing company